Brisbane Roar Women Football Club, formerly known Queensland Roar Women, is an Australian professional women's football club based in Brisbane, Queensland (founded in 2008). The Roar competes in the country's premier women's soccer competition, the A-League Women.

History

Early years
Brisbane Roar (then Queensland Roar) were a founding member of the W-League in 2008. The team was initially coached by Welshman Jeff Hopkins, who had played his football career predominantly in England, as well as representing Wales at the international level. The playing roster featured a mix of youth and veterans, including founding captain and Matilda's stalwart, Kate McShea, and up-and-coming goalkeeper Casey Dumont.

Home ground
Brisbane Roar plays their home games at Dolphin Oval and Lions Stadium. Previous home grounds have included Ballymore Stadium, Perry Park, Queensland Sport and Athletics Centre, Suncorp Stadium, A.J. Kelly Park, Stockland Park and Cleveland Showgrounds.

Players

First-team squad

Reserves
Brisbane Roar also operates four reserve teams, which is mainly formed from Youth players.

Former players
For notable current and former players, see :Category:Brisbane Roar FC (W-League) players

Management

Managerial history

Honours
 Premiers (3): 2008–09 (as Queensland Roar), 2012–13, 2017–18
 Runners-Up (2): 2010–11, 2011–12
 Champions (2): 2008–09 (as Queensland Roar), 2010–11
 Runners-Up (3): 2009, 2011–12, 2013–14

Records

Biggest Victory:
 6–0 vs Perth Glory, 31 October 2009
 6–0 vs Newcastle Jets, 5 December 2009
 6–0 vs  Melbourne Victory, 22 January 2021
Biggest Defeat:
 5–1 vs Sydney FC, 9 December 2018
Highest Scoring Game:
 5–3 Win vs Perth Glory, 7 December 2008
Longest Undefeated Streak:
 18 Matches, 25 October 2008 – 22 November 2009

See also
 List of top-division football clubs in AFC countries
 Women's soccer in Australia
 W-League (Australia) all-time records
 Australia women's national soccer team

References

External links
Brisbane Roar official website
W-League official website
Football Federation Australia official website

 
Brisbane Roar FC
A-League Women teams
Women's soccer clubs in Australia
2008 establishments in Australia

pl:Brisbane Roar#Sekcja kobiet